The 2017 ATP Shenzhen Open was a professional men's tennis tournament played on hard courts. It was the 4th edition of the tournament, and part of the ATP World Tour 250 series of the 2017 ATP World Tour.  It took place at the Shenzhen Longgang Tennis Centre in Shenzhen, China from September 25 to October 1.

Dudi Sela, Israel's # 1 player quit his quarterfinal match in the third set of the 2017 Shenzhen Open so he could begin observing Yom Kippur—the holiest day of the Jewish year—by the time the sun set, forfeiting a possible $34,000 in prize money and 90 rankings points. He had asked the tournament organizers to have his match be moved forward to be completed before sunset to accommodate his religion, but they denied his request.

Singles main draw entrants

Seeds

 1 Rankings are as of September 18, 2017

Other entrants
  Nicola Kuhn 
  Akira Santillan 
  Zhang Ze

The following players received entry from the qualifying draw:
  Matthew Ebden 
  Lloyd Harris 
  Lukáš Lacko
  Zhang Zhizhen

Withdrawals
Before the tournament
  Thomaz Bellucci →replaced by  Nicolás Kicker
  Tomáš Berdych →replaced by  Henri Laaksonen
  Chung Hyeon →replaced by  Marcel Granollers
  Philipp Kohlschreiber →replaced by  Marius Copil
  Janko Tipsarević →replaced by  Alessandro Giannessi

Retirements
  Dudi Sela

Doubles main draw entrants

Seeds

 1 Rankings are as of September 18, 2017

Other entrants 
The following pairs received wildcards into the doubles main draw:
  Bai Yan /  Zhang Zhizhen
  Gong Maoxin /  Zhang Ze

Withdrawals 
During the tournament
  Alexander Zverev

Champions

Singles

  David Goffin def.  Alexandr Dolgopolov, 6–4, 6–7(5–7), 6–3

Doubles

  Alexander Peya /  Rajeev Ram def.  Nikola Mektić /  Nicholas Monroe, 6–3, 6–2

References

External links
Official site

ATP Shenzhen Open
ATP Shenzhen Open
Shenzhen Open
Shenzen Open
Shenzen Open